God on Trial is a 2008 British television play written by Frank Cottrell-Boyce, starring Antony Sher, Rupert Graves and Jack Shepherd. The play takes place in Auschwitz during World War II. The Jewish prisoners put God on trial in absentia for abandoning the Jewish people. The question is whether God has broken his covenant with the Jewish people by allowing the Germans to commit genocide. It was produced and shown by the BBC on 3 September 2008.  Production was supported by PBS, which screened the play as part of its Masterpiece anthology.

The play is based on the Elie Wiesel play The Trial of God. Cottrell-Boyce describes this tale as "apocryphal". Wiesel later stated that the event was true, and that he had witnessed it. According to Cottrell-Boyce, producer Mark Redhead "had been trying to turn the story into a film for almost 20 years by the time he called me in 2005 to write the screenplay."

Plot
Jewish prisoners in a barrack at Auschwitz question why God has let this happen to them, His chosen people, and decide to try God in absentia to get at the answer. This becomes an extended debate on why God permits evil. The first theory proposed, that God must allow people to choose actions that lead to horrible results because human freedom of will is such an important value—a solution many consider the true one—is rejected with contempt, and the debate continues. Finally, one of the men reviews the record of God's deeds in the Hebrew Bible, and draws the conclusion that the true answer is that God is not good. He states this so powerfully that the others accept it, and there is a moment of silence. "So what do we do?" says one. "We pray," says the proposer of the theory grimly, and they rise, face one way and begin to pray. The scene fades to the present day, with visitors to Auschwitz standing stunned in the same space; the ghostly figures of the prisoners are seen among them, praying.

Cast
 Joseph Alessi - Kapo
 Josef Altin - Isaac
 Ashley Artus - Ricard
 Alexi Kaye Campbell - Doctor (presumably Josef Mengele)
 Dominic Cooper - Moche
 Lorcan Cranitch - Blockaltester
 Stephen Dillane - Schmidt
 Rupert Graves - Mordechai
 François Guetary - Jacques
 David de Keyser - Hugo
 Agnieszka Liggett - Tour Guide
 Louise Mardenborough - Emily
 Eddie Marsan - Lieble
 André Oumansky - Jacob
 Blake Ritson - Idek
 Jack Shepherd - Kuhn
 Antony Sher - Akiba
 Stellan Skarsgård - Baumgarten
 René Zagger - Ezra
 Dailly Hilaire

Score
The music for the film was especially commissioned and composed by Nick Green and Tristin Norwell.

Reception
Reviews were overwhelmingly positive. Sam Wollaston in The Guardian found it "powerful and thoughtful stuff, with some fine performances by some fine actors – Antony Sher, Rupert Graves, Dominic Cooper."  Remarking that Cottrell-Boyce wrote the piece from a position of personal faith, James Walton in The Telegraph observed, "Yet, as each of the characters put forward a different view on the question of God and suffering, it was clear that he was willing to interrogate his beliefs with real ferocity." This was a complex piece, and "as the fierceness of the intellectual and emotional grip tightened, it was impossible to imagine any halfway-thoughtful viewers, of whatever prior convictions, not having a disturbing sense of their own ideas coming under sustained and convincing attack." In a long review for The Times, Tim Teeman had great praise for the cast: "The performances were so strong it felt a privilege to watch the actors, among them Antony Sher, Rupert Graves, Stephen Dillane and Jack Shepherd." He also praises director Andy de Emmony's "brilliant, arresting sleight of hand... [mixing] the prisoners, naked and shorn, together with the present-day touring party in the gas chamber."  For The Independent, Thomas Sutcliffe remarked on Sher's role as the play's smouldering fuse: "Every now and then you saw Antony Sher, davening silently in a corner of the barracks. Like a loaded gun in a Chekhov play, you knew he was going to go off eventually and that it would be significant when he did, and indeed it was his explosive inventory of God's biblically attested crimes that finally swung the judges in favour of a guilty verdict."

Opposite fierce competition from the much-trailed, eagerly awaited debut episode of ITV's four-part-time travel fantasy series, Lost in Austen, and an episode of the BBC's celebrity genealogy show, Who Do You Think You Are?, featuring Esther Rantzen, God on Trial attracted 700,000 viewers on BBC2, a 3% share of the audience, according to overnight returns.

When the show was shown in the United States on PBS, the Los Angeles Times said "They are big topics addressed with a striking lack of sentimentality, quite a feat considering the setting."  The San Francisco Chronicle echoed the British reviewers in praising the "brilliant script" the "subtle wonders at every turn" in DeEmmony's direction, and remarked that "It seems trivial even to try to single out one superb performance from virtually every other superb performance."

Distribution

God on Trial aired on BBC2 on Wednesday 3 September 2008 and on PBS in the Masterpiece Contemporary strand on 9 November 2008.

See also
 Lawsuits against God

References

External links
 

2008 television films
2008 films
Holocaust films
Fictional lawsuits against God
Films about lawsuits against God
British drama films
Films with screenplays by Frank Cottrell-Boyce
2008 drama films
Television Academy Honors winners
2000s English-language films
2000s British films